This is a list of Philippine Basketball Association players by total career minutes played.

Statistics accurate as of January 16, 2023.

See also
List of Philippine Basketball Association players

References

External links

Games Played